Sydney W. Hill  was an American politician who served as a Socialist member of the Oklahoma House of Representatives representing Roger Mills County between 1914 and 1916. He was one of the first third party candidates elected to the Oklahoma House of Representatives alongside fellow Socialist Party Representatives David C. Kirkpatrick, N. D. Pritchett, Charles Henry Ingham, and Thomas Henry McLemore.

He later ran for his former seat in the 1930 and 1940 elections as a Democrat. He later died on November 25, 1958 and was buried at Silent Home Cemetery in Roll, Oklahoma.

References

20th-century American politicians
20th-century Members of the Oklahoma House of Representatives
Socialist Party members of the Oklahoma House of Representatives
Year of birth missing
1958 deaths